The Archives Service Center (ASC) is one of the main repositories within the University Library System at the University of Pittsburgh and houses collections of various manuscripts, media, maps, and other materials of historical, social and scientific content. It houses and functions as the repository for collections that document and describe the history of the Western Pennsylvania region, Allegheny County, Pennsylvania, the city of Pittsburgh, and the University of Pittsburgh.

Overview 
Some of the history of Pittsburgh and the western Pennsylvania region has been documented by primary sources on manuscripts, books, maps, personal diaries, audio recordings, photographs and other materials from the past. The ASC collects material related to the history of this region. The holdings in the collections span over a hundred years, primarily from the mid-19th century to the late 20th century. Some of the content is digitized and accessible online. Content published before 1923 is in the public domain or the rights belong to the university.

Major collections 

Some of ASC's major collections include:

 Labor
 University Archives
 Audio-visual Materials
 Politics and Local Politics
 20th Century Urban Renewable
 Women's History
 Business and Industry
 Social Action
 Ethnic Groups in Pittsburgh
 Civil Rights

Usage 

Often, when the estate of a notable person  dies, the family donates historical documents, physical objects, photographs, and other materials that they wish to have preserved. One such donation consisted of the mining maps of Western Pennsylvania. Many of the coal mining companies are no longer in business and have closed or sold coal mines in the Western Pennsylvania region. These maps were determined to be of historical value and are now housed by the archives. Individuals and organizations that research drilling, 'fracking', the foundations of buildings, roadways and other structures often visit the ASC to examine the maps to establish the safety and accuracy of their projects. The ASC received canvas maps charting the existence, location and status of working coal mines and closed mines. These maps, some as long as 10 meters are stored in a climate controlled section of the archives. The Archive Service center has worked to add content from its collections to Wikipedia.

References

University of Pittsburgh
Online music and lyrics databases
Music libraries
History of labor relations in the United States
Political history of the United States
Digital library projects
Online archives of the United States
Music organizations based in the United States